Jonkershoek Nature Reserve is a CapeNature nature reserve located approximately  south-east of the town of Stellenbosch in the Western Cape province of South Africa.

Description
The reserve lies north of the Hottentots-Holland Mountains within the Hottentots-Holland Mountain Catchment Area and it contains the smaller Assegaaibosch Nature Reserve. It includes the Jonkershoek Mountains and portions of the upper Jonkershoek valley. The Eerste River and Berg River have their origins in these mountains, the former also flowing through the Jonkershoek valley on its way to False Bay.

History
The name Jonkershoek is said to hail from the 17th century owner of one of the freeholds that Simon van der Stel issued in the valley: Jan Andriessen, who had been a bachelor midshipman, was also known as Jan de Jonkheer  and named his grant of land Vallei Jonkershoek.

Started as the Assegaaibosch farmstead in 1790, it was subsequently altered substantially by its various occupants. In 1817 Lord Charles Somerset granted the land to Wouter Eduard Wium, with the special proviso that he plant oak trees, and the area now includes many huge oaks.

In 1960 the Cape Provincial Administration purchased Assegaaibosch, and the house was renovated to its present condition. It is now a national monument and is used as a guest house.

Wildlife
The Jonkershoek mountains are home to leopard, caracal, klipspringer, baboon, honey badger and mongoose, however, all but the baboons are very secretive. Birdlife include kingfisher, black eagle, fish eagle, spotted eagle-owl, sugarbirds, orange-breasted sunbirds and protea seedeaters.

Access
The reserve can be accessed from Stellenbosch via Jonkershoek Road.

References

External links

 Official website
 Hikes in Jonkershoek

Nature reserves in South Africa
Provincial nature reserves of the Western Cape
Stellenbosch